Attorney General Cassidy may refer to:

John Edward Cassidy (1896–1984), Attorney General of Illinois
Lewis C. Cassidy (1829–1889),  Attorney General of Pennsylvania

See also
General Cassidy (disambiguation)